The Pinchot–Ballinger controversy, also known as the "Ballinger Affair", was a dispute between U.S. Forest Service Chief Gifford Pinchot and U.S. Secretary of the Interior Richard A. Ballinger that contributed to the split of the Republican Party before the 1912 presidential election and helped to define the U.S. conservation movement in the early 20th century.

Ballinger's appointment 
In March 1909, President William Howard Taft began his administration by replacing Theodore Roosevelt's Secretary of the Interior, James Rudolph Garfield, with Richard A. Ballinger, a former Mayor of Seattle who had served as Commissioner of the General Land Office (GLO) under Secretary Garfield. Ballinger's appointment was a disappointment to conservationists, who interpreted the replacement of Garfield as a break with Roosevelt administration policies on conservationism.  Within weeks of taking office, Ballinger reversed some of Garfield's policies, restoring 3 million acres (12,000 km²) to private use.

Allegations by Pinchot and Glavis 

By July 1909, Gifford Pinchot, who had been appointed by President William McKinley to head the USDA Division of Forestry in 1898, and who had run the U.S. Forest Service since it had taken over management of forest reserves from the General Land Office in 1905, became convinced that Ballinger intended to "stop the conservation movement". In August, speaking at the annual meeting of the National Irrigation Congress in Spokane, Washington, he accused Ballinger of siding with private trusts in his handling of water power issues. At the same time, he helped to arrange a meeting between President Taft and Louis Glavis, chief of the Portland, Oregon, Field Division of the GLO. Glavis met with the president at Taft's summer retreat in Beverly, Massachusetts, and presented him with a 50-page report accusing Ballinger of an improper interest in his handling of coal field claims in Alaska.

Glavis claimed that Ballinger, first as Commissioner of the General Land Office, and then as Secretary of the Interior, had interfered with investigations of coal claim purchases made by Clarence Cunningham of Idaho. In 1907, Cunningham had partnered with the Morgan–Guggenheim "Alaska Syndicate" to develop coal interests in Alaska. The GLO had launched an anti-trust investigation, headed by Glavis. Ballinger, then head of the GLO, rejected Glavis's findings and removed him from the investigation. In 1908, Ballinger stepped down from the GLO, and took up a private law practice in Seattle. Cunningham became a client.

Convinced that Ballinger, now the head of the United States Department of Interior, had a personal interest in obstructing an investigation of the Cunningham case, Glavis had sought support from the U.S. Forest Service, whose jurisdiction over the Chugach National Forest included several of the Cunningham claims. He received a sympathetic response from Alexander Shaw, Overton Price and Pinchot, who helped him to prepare the presentation for Taft.

Dismissals, investigations, and scandal 
Taft consulted with Attorney General George Wickersham before issuing a public letter in September, exonerating Ballinger and authorizing the dismissal of Glavis on grounds of insubordination. At the same time, Taft tried to conciliate Pinchot and affirm his administration's pro-conservation stance.

Glavis took his case to the press. In November, Collier's Weekly published an article elaborating his allegations, entitled The Whitewashing of Ballinger: Are the Guggenheims in Charge of the Department of the Interior? 

In January 1910, Pinchot sent an open letter to Senator Jonathan P. Dolliver, who read it into the Congressional Record. Pinchot praised Glavis as a "patriot", openly rebuked Taft, and asked for Congressional hearings into the propriety of Ballinger's dealings. Pinchot was promptly fired, but from January to May, the United States House of Representatives held hearings on Ballinger. Ballinger was cleared of any wrongdoing, but criticized from some quarters for favoring private enterprise and the exploitation of natural resources over conservationism.

Consequences 
The firing of Pinchot, a close friend of Teddy Roosevelt, alienated many progressives within the Republican party and drove a wedge between Taft and Roosevelt himself, leading to the split of the Republican Party in the 1912 presidential election.

Investigation 
The affair was officially investigated over two decades later by Secretary of the Interior Harold L. Ickes. Ickes published a popular account of his findings in the Saturday Evening Post.  His official findings were expanded to 58 pages and published by the Department under the title "Not Guilty : an official inquiry into the charges made by Glavis and Pinchot against Richard A. Ballinger, Secretary of the interior, 1909-1911" (Washington: Government Printing Office, 1940). Ickes declares Ballinger innocent and paints Pinchot as a publicity-seeking, vindictive man who pursued Ballinger even after the accused had died (page 3).

Notes

1909 in the United States
Political scandals in the United States
Political history of the United States
Pre-statehood history of Alaska
Progressive Era in the United States